Saria Island, anciently known as Sarus or Saros, is an island in Greece. It is a rocky, volcanic island just to the north of Karpathos, separated from it by a strait 100 m (330 ft) wide. It is part of the Dodekanissos archipelago. In ancient times, a city-state called Saros was situated on the island. It was a member of the Delian League.

Administratively, it is part of the community of Olympos. The 2011 census reported a resident population of 45 persons. It has little plant or animal life, and has a number of steep cliffs. Although only shepherds live on Saria now, the ruins of the ancient city of Nisyros can be found here. It is also a breeding area for Eleonora's falcons.

Although the name is subject to dispute, scholars link it with the name of an ancient Greek princess named Katherine from a line of Saria royalty. Greek legends say she was as beautiful as Helen of Troy and so they named an island after her. On the island of Saria, it is recorded history that a kingdom existed named Mikri Nisyros.

References

External links

 Map of Saria Island in relation to community of Olympos and Karpathos Island

Islands of Greece
Dodecanese
Landforms of Karpathos (regional unit)
Islands of the South Aegean
Members of the Delian League
Natura 2000 in Greece